Marina da Glória is a marina located in the neighbourhood of Glória in Rio de Janeiro, Brazil. This venue hosted the sailing events for the 2016 Summer Olympics within the Flamengo Park cluster, from 7 to 19 August 2016. and the 2016 Summer Paralympics. It also hosted the draw procedure for the Qualification for the 2014 FIFA World Cup.

References

Rio2016.org.br bid package. Volume 2. p. 18.

Guanabara Bay
Olympic sailing venues
Sports venues in Rio de Janeiro (city)
Venues of the 2016 Summer Olympics
Sports venues completed in 2016
2016 establishments in Brazil